Carroll Township is a township in Texas County, in the U.S. state of Missouri.

Carroll Township was erected in 1845, taking its name from E. G. Carroll, a pioneer citizen.

References

Townships in Missouri
Townships in Texas County, Missouri